Anton Vladimirovich Makovich (born 2 August 1988) is a Russian former professional football player.

Club career
He played in the Russian Football National League for FC Lada Togliatti in 2006.

See also
Football in Russia

References

External links
 
 

1988 births
Living people
Russian footballers
Association football midfielders
FC Lada-Tolyatti players
FC Khimik Dzerzhinsk players